The All-Party Parliamentary Group Against Antisemitism is a group in the Parliament of the United Kingdom. The group exists to "To combat antisemitism and help develop and seek implementation of effective public policy to combat antisemitism". The group's co-chairs are MPs Catherine McKinnell (Labour) and Andrew Percy (Conservative) and the president is former Labour MP Lord Mann.

The group commissioned the All-Party Parliamentary Inquiry into Antisemitism in 2005. The inquiry panel, chaired by former Europe Minister Denis MacShane, gathered written and oral evidence on antisemitism in Britain and published a report of their findings on 7 September 2006. The panel's recommendations included improved reporting and recording of antisemitic attacks; a crackdown on anti-Jewish activity on university campuses; and improved international co-operation to prevent the spread of racist material online.

In 2012, John Mann commissioned an all-party parliamentary inquiry into electoral conduct, based on a recommendation from the antisemitism report of 2006. That inquiry panel was chaired by Natascha Engel and its report was published in October 2013.

The Labour government responded to the inquiry twice and the Coalition government has since responded for a third time. Secretariat to the group is provided by the PCAA Foundation.

References

External links
All-Party Parliamentary Group Against Antisemitism UK Parliament website
General website for the All-Party Parliamentary Group Against Antisemitism

All-Party Parliamentary Groups
Antisemitism in the United Kingdom
2005 establishments in the United Kingdom
Organizations established in 2005